Panelo is a surname. Notable people with the name include:

 Belinda Panelo (born 1974), Filipino-American actress and model
 Salvador Panelo (born 1946), Filipino lawyer and former presidential spokesperson

References

Spanish-language surnames